Guldemond is a surname. Notable people with the surname include:

Chas Guldemond (born 1987), American snowboarder
Ryan Guldemond (born 1986), Canadian musician